Pternozyga argodoxa is a species of moth of the family Tortricidae. It is found in India.

References

	

Moths described in 1922
Archipini